Church of St Margaret is a  Grade I listed church in Knotting, Bedfordshire, England. It became a listed building on 13 July 1964. The church was originally built in the 12th century. It underwent extensive renovation in the late 2000s.

See also
Grade I listed buildings in Bedfordshire

References

Church of England church buildings in Bedfordshire
Grade I listed churches in Bedfordshire